Koen is an unincorporated community in Prowers County, in the U.S. state of Colorado.

The community was named after Festus B. Koen, who was credited with irrigating the site.

References

Unincorporated communities in Prowers County, Colorado
Unincorporated communities in Colorado